Athola is a village in Jalandhar. Jalandhar is a district in the Indian state of Punjab.

About 
Athola lies on the Jalandhar-Kapurthala road.  The nearest railway station to Athola is Khojowal Railway station at 4 km from it.

Home of Sampay's Nanakay. 

The village is administrated by a Sarpanch, who is an elected representative of the village as per the constitution of India. Current position is held by Gurpreet singh

Post code 
Athola's post code is 144002.

References 

Villages in Jalandhar district